Reznik is a surname derived from Czech řezník ("one who cuts") or ("butcher") or Yiddish reznik (רזניק, borrowed from a Slavic language, "Kosher slaughterer" (shochet)).

People
 Anjelika Reznik (born 1995), Canadian rhythmic gymnast
 Henri Reznik (born 1938), Russian celebrity lawyer
 Ilya Reznik (born 1938), Russian poet and songwriter
 Judith Resnik (1949–1986), American astronaut
 Kateryna Reznik (born 1995), Ukrainian synchronized swimmer
 Kirill Reznik (born 1974), Ukraine-born American politician
 Michael Resnik (born 1938), American philosopher and writer
 Mykhailo Reznik (born 1950), Ukrainian diplomat
 Semyon Reznik (born 1938), Russian writer
 Stepan Reznik (born 1983), Russian football player and coach
 Valeriya Reznik (born 1985), Russian speed skater
 Victoria Reznik (born 1995), Canadian rhythmic gymnast
 Vladislav Reznik (born 1954), Russian businessman and politician
 Yuri Reznik (born 1954), Ukrainian footballer
 Vera Reznik (born 1944), Russian writer and translator

Fictional characters
 Morgan Reznik, character in The Good Doctor (TV series)
 Servath Reznik, character in the tabletop game Warmachine
 Tracy Reznik, character in the game Identity V
 Trevor Reznik, character in the movie The Machinist
 Reznik Shaman, character in the game World of Warcraft

See also
 
 Resnik (disambiguation)
 Řezník (disambiguation)
 Resnick 
 Resnik (surname)
 Reznikov

References

Surnames of Slavic origin
Jewish surnames
Yiddish-language surnames